The modern pentathlon at the 1988 Summer Olympics was represented by two events (both for men): Individual competition and Team competition. It was fought in five days on September 18 to 22, and individual results were also directly applied towards the team event ranking.

Results

References

External links
Official Olympic Report

1988 Summer Olympics events
Men's individual